The Burford Bulldogs were a Canadian Junior Hockey team based in Burford, Ontario, Canada. They played in the Provincial Junior Hockey League.

History
The Burford Bulldogs were founded in 1988 after a long layoff of junior hockey in the town of Burford.  The previous team to play in Burford was the Burford Knights in the mid to late 1970s.

As members of the new Southern Ontario merger Western Junior D Hockey League, the Bulldogs found themselves sandwiched in with 17 other teams. In only their second season, 1989–90, the Bulldogs  celebrated their first winning season with 19 wins and 12 losses with 4 ties.  A season later they did the same with 22 wins, 15, losses, and 3 extra points.  In 1991-92 they had their best season ever with 25 wins and 10 losses, finishing 4th overall.

In 2006-07, the OHA Junior Development League was disbanded and the Southern Ontario Junior Hockey League was created in its place.

After significant restructuring in the Summer of 2013, the Bulldogs found themselves in the Midwestern Junior C Hockey League.

As of 2016-17 season, the eight Junior "C" hockey leagues in Ontario amalgamated into one league, the Provincial Junior Hockey League. The teams formerly occupying the Midwestern League were placed in the South Conference and re-branded the Pat Doherty division.

As a result of the COVID-19 pandemic and poor support, the Bulldogs surrendered their playoff position, and folded at the end of the 2021-2022 season. The Bulldogs were winless within this season.

Season-by-season results

Notable alumni
Jay Wells

References

External links
Burford Bulldogs Website

Southern Ontario Junior Hockey League teams
1988 establishments in Ontario
Ice hockey clubs established in 1988
2022 disestablishments in Ontario